Albert D. J. Cashier (December 25, 1843 – October 10, 1915), born Jennie Irene Hodgers, was an American soldier who served in the Union Army during the American Civil War. Cashier adopted the identity of a man before enlisting, and maintained it until death. Cashier became famous as one of a number of women soldiers who served as men during the Civil War, although the consistent and long-term (at least 53 years) commitment to a male identity has prompted some contemporary scholars to suggest that Cashier was a trans man.

Early life
Cashier was very elderly and disoriented when interviewed about immigrating to the United States and enlisting in the army, and had always been evasive about early life; therefore, the available narratives are often contradictory. According to later investigation by the administrator of Cashier's estate, Albert Cashier was born Jennie Hodgers in Clogherhead, County Louth, Ireland on December 25, 1843, to Sallie and Patrick Hodgers. Typically, the youth's uncle or stepfather was said to have dressed his charge in male clothing in order to find work in an all-male shoe factory in Illinois. Even before the advent of the war, Hodgers adopted the identity of Albert Cashier in order to live independently. Sallie Hodgers, Cashier's mother, was known to have died prior to 1862, by which time her child had traveled as a stowaway to Belvidere, Illinois, and was working as a farmhand to a man named Avery.

Enlistment
Cashier first enlisted in July 1862 after President Lincoln's call for soldiers. As time passed, the need for soldiers only increased. On August 6, 1862, the eighteen-year-old enlisted in the 95th Illinois Infantry for a three-year term using the name "Albert D.J. Cashier" and was assigned to Company G. Cashier was listed in the company catalog as nineteen years old upon enlistment, and small in stature.

Many soldiers from Belvidere participated in the Battle of Shiloh as members of the Fifteenth Illinois Volunteers, where the Union had suffered heavy losses. Cashier took the train with others from Belvidere to Rockford in order to enlist, in answer to the call for more soldiers. Along with others from Boone and McHenry counties, Cashier learned how to be a volunteer infantryman of the 95th Regiment at Camp Fuller. After being shipped out by steamer and rail to Confederate strongholds in Columbus, Kentucky and Jackson, Tennessee, the 95th was ordered to Grand Junction where it became part of the Army of the Tennessee under General Ulysses S. Grant.

During the war
The regiment was part of the Army of the Tennessee under Ulysses S. Grant and fought in approximately forty battles, including the Siege of Vicksburg.   During this campaign, Cashier was captured while performing reconnaissance, but managed to escape and return to the regiment. In June 1863, still during the siege, Cashier contracted chronic diarrhea and entered a military hospital, somehow managing to evade detection.

In the spring of 1864, the regiment was also present at the Red River Campaign under General Nathaniel Banks, and in June 1864 at the Battle of Brice's Crossroads in Guntown, Mississippi, where they suffered heavy casualties. 

Following a period to recuperate and regroup following the debacle at Brice, the 95th, now a seasoned and battle-hardened regiment, saw additional action in the Winter of 1864 in the Franklin-Nashville Campaign, at the battles of Spring Hill and Franklin, the defense of Nashville, and the pursuit of General Hood.

During the war, the regiment traveled a total of about 9,000 miles. Other soldiers thought that Cashier was small and preferred to be alone, which were not uncommon characteristics for soldiers. Cashier fought with the regiment through the war until honorably discharged on August 17, 1865, when all the soldiers were mustered out.

Cashier was one of at least 250 soldiers who were assigned female at birth and enlisted as men to fight in the Civil War.

Postwar

After the war, Cashier returned to Belvidere, Illinois for a time, working for Samuel Pepper and continuing to live as a man. Settling in Saunemin, Illinois in 1869, Cashier worked as a farmhand as well as performing odd jobs around the town, and can be found in the town payroll records. Cashier lived with employer Joshua Chesbro and his family in exchange for work, and had also slept for a time in the Cording Hardware store in exchange for labor. In 1885, the Chesbro family had a small house built for Cashier. For over forty years, Cashier lived in Saunemin and was a church janitor, cemetery worker, and street lamplighter. Living as a man allowed Cashier to vote in elections and to later claim a veteran's pension under the same name. Pension payments started in 1907.

In later years, Cashier ate with the neighboring Lannon family. The Lannons discovered their friend's sex when Cashier fell ill, but decided not to make their discovery public.

In 1911, Cashier, who was working for State Senator Ira Lish, was hit by the Senator's car, resulting in a broken leg. A physician found out Cashier's secret in the hospital, but did not disclose the information. No longer able to work, Cashier was moved to the Soldiers and Sailors home in Quincy, Illinois on May 5, 1911. Many friends and fellow soldiers from the Ninety-fifth Regiment visited. Cashier lived there until an obvious deterioration of mind began to take place and was moved to the Watertown State Hospital for the Insane in East Moline, Illinois in March 1914. Attendants at the Watertown State Hospital discovered Cashier's sex, at which point Cashier was made to wear women's clothes again after presumably more than fifty years of dressing as male. In 1914, Cashier was investigated for fraud by the veterans' pension board; former comrades confirmed that Cashier was in fact the person who had fought in the Civil War and the board decided in February 1915 that payments should continue for life.

Death and legacy
Albert Cashier died on October 10, 1915, and was buried in uniform. The tombstone was inscribed "Albert D. J. Cashier, Co. G, 95 Ill. Inf." Cashier was given an official Grand Army of the Republic funerary service, and was buried with full military honors. It took W.J. Singleton (executor of Cashier's estate) nine years to track Cashier's identity back to the birth name of Jennie Hodgers. None of the would-be heirs proved convincing, and the estate of about $282 (after payment of funeral expenses) was deposited in the Adams County, Illinois, treasury. In the 1970s, a second tombstone, inscribed with both names, was placed near the first one at Sunny Slope cemetery in Saunemin, Illinois.

Cashier is listed on the internal wall of the Illinois memorial at Vicksburg National Military Park.

A musical entitled The Civility of Albert Cashier has been produced based on Cashier's life; the work was described by the Chicago Tribune as "A timely musical about a trans soldier".
Also Known As Albert D. J. Cashier: The Jennie Hodgers Story is a biography written by veteran Lon P. Dawson, who lived at the Illinois Veterans Home where Cashier once lived. The novel My Last Skirt, by Lynda Durrant, is based on Cashier's life. Cashier was mentioned in a collection of essays called Nine Irish Lives, in which Cashier's biography was written by Jill McDonough.

In Michael Leali's 2022 young adult novel, The Civil War of Amos Abernathy, Cashier stands in for a penpal.

Cashier's house has been restored in Saunemin.

Authors including Michael Bronski, Jason Cromwell, Kirstin Cronn-Mills, and Nicholas Teich have suggested or argued that Cashier was a trans man due to living as a man for at least 53 years.

See also
 Amelio Robles Ávila, Mexican revolutionary
 Christian Davies
 James Barry (surgeon)
 John/Eleanor Rykener
 Hannah Snell
 Ralph Kerwineo

Notes

References

Further reading
 Bradford, Martin J. (2015). A Velvet Fist in an Iron Glove: The Curious Case of Albert Cashier. Kindle Ebooks @ Amazon. Historical/fiction novel account of the life of Jennie Hodgers/Albert Cashier.
 Durant, Lynda. (2006). My Last Skirt: the Story of Jennie Hodgers, Union Soldier. New York: Clarion Books.  Historical fiction account of Jennie Hodgers' life.
 Eggleston, Larry G. (2003). Women in the Civil War: Extraordinary Stories of Soldiers, Spies, Nurses, Doctors, Crusaders, and Others. Jefferson, North Carolina: McFarland & Company, Inc.

External links
"When Jennie Comes Marchin' Home" at Illinois Periodicals Online; includes photo of Cashier's headstone
Dawson, Lon P. "Also Known As Albert D. J. Cashier: The Jennie Hodgers Story" (review) Compass Rose Cultural Crossroads website
 
Shiels, Damien. "Jennie Hodgers: The Irishwoman Who Fought as a Man in the Union Army" Irish in the American Civil War website
Bunbury, Turtle.  "The Amazing Story of Little Al Cashier, a Transgender Civil War Hero", The Daily Beast, 2017-09-24. Retrieved 2019-06-19.
O'Halloran, Oran & Ryhan. "I, Me" (podcast episode) We, The Irish podcast. Released 2021-08-20

1843 births
1915 deaths
Female wartime cross-dressers in the American Civil War
Historical figures with ambiguous or disputed gender identity
Irish emigrants to the United States (before 1923)
People from Belvidere, Illinois
People from County Louth
People from Livingston County, Illinois
People from Quincy, Illinois
People of Illinois in the American Civil War
Transgender men
Transgender military personnel
Union Army soldiers